Darrell Basham (born March 17, 1949) is an American stock car racing driver and team owner. He currently competes in the ARCA Racing Series, driving the No. 34 Chevrolet for Darrell Basham Racing.

Racing career

ARCA Racing Series

Basham made his ARCA Racing Series debut in 1972. In 1975, Basham posted a career-best finish of fifth twice, both times at Salem Speedway. One year later, he finished a career-best seventh place in the standings.

After driving sporadically over the next two decades, Basham began racing full-time again in 2002. The next season, Basham won the Spirit Award for his dedication and support for ARCA, uplifting spirit by way of example, perseverance, and positive attitude. He finished ninth in the 2009 Lucas Oil Slick Mist 200 at Daytona, tying his career-best finish at the track from 33 years earlier. That same year, Basham and his son Jason made ARCA history by becoming the first father/son duo to finish in the top 20 in the standings the same year.

In 2011, Basham competed in all 19 races, having a best finish of 12th at Salem Speedway and finishing 10th in the season point standings. He also won the Spirit Award for the second time.

Basham made his 300th career ARCA start at Lucas Oil Raceway at Indianapolis in 2012, finishing 21st in the event. He had a best finish of 14th place that season at Winchester Speedway, and ultimately finished 11th in the points standings. He was awarded the Marcum Award at the Championship Awards Banquet for his positive efforts and contributions within the ARCA Racing community.

After racing a full schedule in the ARCA Racing Series for the previous 11 seasons, the 63-year-old Basham decided to reduce his schedule for the 2013 season and only compete on short tracks.

NASCAR
Basham has competed in a single NASCAR Winston Cup Series event in his career, the 1979 Sun-Drop Music City USA 420 at Nashville Speedway in Nashville, Tennessee. He started and finished 24th in the 28-car field, completing 101 of the race's 420 laps before retiring from the event due to rear end failure. Basham also competed in the NASCAR-sanctioned Goody's Dash Series, a racing formula for four-cylinder subcompact cars, in the early and mid 1990s.

Personal life
Basham has three children. His son Jason competed in 60 ARCA Racing Series events between 2003 and 2013.

Basham operates a business as an independent trucker, operating his shop and trucking business from shops attached to his home in Henryville; he builds his own racing engines as well. On March 2, 2012, Basham's race shop was destroyed by a tornado that devastated Henryville; Basham was able to salvage his race cars and other parts to reopen in a garage in Marysville, Indiana, and successfully resumed racing in ARCA, christening his car the Spirit of Henryville. He also has a son named Mike, and a brother named Dugan, who worked as a crew chief for his Darrell's team.

Motorsports career results

NASCAR
(key) (Bold – Pole position awarded by qualifying time. Italics – Pole position earned by points standings or practice time. * – Most laps led.)

Winston Cup Series

ARCA Menards Series
(key) (Bold – Pole position awarded by qualifying time. Italics – Pole position earned by points standings or practice time. * – Most laps led.)

References

External links
 

Living people
1949 births
People from Henryville, Indiana
Racing drivers from Indiana
NASCAR drivers
ARCA Menards Series drivers
American Speed Association drivers